Skytturnar is the soundtrack to the Icelandic film directed by Friðrik Þór Friðriksson in 1987. This 12" EP was released through the Gramm-label and was produced by Kjartan Kjartansson and the renowned Tómas Magnús Tómasson.
The soundtrack includes several well known Icelandic artists such as Bubbi & MX-21, Hilmar Örn Hilmarsson and Sykurmolarnir (later known as The Sugarcubes) with the collaboration of Þór Eldon Jónsson (who would later join the band).
The soundtrack EP includes four of the songs used in Skytturnar, there were 14 different pieces of music used in the movie, mostly as coincidental music. The EP has never been reissued and is currently widely unavailable.

Track listing

Track notes
"Drekkin" is an Icelandic version of "Dragon", a song that appeared for the first time on The Sugarcubes’ debut album Life's Too Good in 1987.

Credits

Performers
Side A:
"Skyttan": Bubbi Morthens - music and lyrics.
Bubbi Morthens - vocals. MX-21 (Þorsteinn Magnússon - guitar. Jakob Smári Magnússon - bass. Halldór Lárusson - drums. Tómas Magnús Tómasson - keyboards).
Production: Tómas Magnús Tómasson.
Arrangements: Bubbi & MX-21 / Tómas M. Tómasson.
Recording studio: Sýrland.

Side B:
"Drekkin": Þór Eldon Jónsson - guitar & Sykurmolarnir (Björk Guðmundsdóttir - vocals. Einar Örn Benediktsson - vocals. Þór Eldon Jónsson - guitar. Bragi Ólafsson - bass. Friðrik Erlingsson - guitar).
"Inn í Borgina": Sykurmolarnir.
"Stemning": Friðrik Erlingsson - guitar.
Producer: Kjartan Kjartansson.
Arrangements: Sykurmolarnir.
Recording studio: Hljóðaklett.

Personnel
Sound recording: Þorbjörn Erlingsson and Þorvar Hafsteinsson.
Album design: Friðrik Erlingsson.
Pressing: Prisma.

See also
1987 Skytturnar (Icelandic Film Corporation), the film.

External links

Filmography of Friðrik Þór Friðriksson at Yahoo.com
Sykurmolarnir.com
Official site of Björk - Vocalist of The Sugarcubes.
Björkish.net - Page about Björk.
Official site of Sigtryggur Baldursson - Drummer of The Sugarcubes.
Official Website of Bubbi Morthens
Page about Bubbi Morthens at Rate Your Music.com
Page of Jakob Smári Magnússon at MySpace.com
Page of Þorsteinn Magnússon at MySpace.com

Page of HÖH at Rate Your Music.com

Pop albums by Icelandic artists
Film soundtracks
1987 soundtrack albums